Perley Keyes (February 24, 1774 in  – May 13, 1834) was an American politician from New York.

Life
Keyes was born in Acworth, then in Cheshire County, now in Sullivan County, New Hampshire, the son of Capt. William Keyes (born 1740) and Hannah (Scarborough) Keyes. On November 20, 1796, he married Lorinda White, and they had three children. They moved to Rutland, New York in 1800.

Keyes was an associate judge of the Jefferson County Court in 1807, and Sheriff of Jefferson County from 1808 to 1812.

He was a member of the New York State Senate (Western D.) from 1814 to 1815, sitting in the 37th and 38th; and (Eastern D.) from 1816 to 1817, sitting in the 39th and 40th New York State Legislatures. While in the Senate, Keyes was nominated on November 18, and confirmed by the U.S. Senate on December 9, 1814, as Collector of Customs at Sackett's Harbor. He was also a member of the Council of Appointment in 1816.

He was again a member of the State Senate (5th D.) from 1824 to 1827, sitting in the 47th, 48th, 49th and 50th New York State Legislatures.

Keyes and his friend Silas Wright were both stalwart supporters of Martin Van Buren. After his presidency, Van Buren described his deceased friend in the following way: "[W]hile [Keyes'] want of education was often embarrassing to himself and his friends, still his profound knowledge of the springs of human action always seemed to be an ample compensation; and that he had never met the man whom he thought the Almighty had created shrewder than Perley Keyes."

Upon Keyes' death in Watertown, New York his political understudy Orville Hungerford took over the Democratic Party in Jefferson County, New York.

References

Sources
Genealogy of the Descendants of John White of Wenham and Lancaster, Mass. by Almira Larkin White (1900; Vol. 2; pg. 430)
History of Acworth by John Leverett Merrill (pg. 233)
The New York Civil List compiled by Franklin Benjamin Hough (pages 122f, 125ff, 142 and 401; Weed, Parsons and Co., 1858)
Journal of the Executive Proceedings of the U.S. Senate (1828; Vol. II; pg. 586-590)

1774 births
1834 deaths
People from Acworth, New Hampshire
Politicians from Watertown, New York
New York (state) state senators
New York (state) sheriffs
New York (state) Democratic-Republicans